Manuel Robles Aguila (born 6 March 1959 in Monachil, Granada) is a class 5 table tennis player from Spain. He played at the 1992,  1996, 2000 and 2004 Summer Paralympics.  In 2000, he finished third in the open 1–5 singles table tennis event.

References 

1959 births
Spanish male table tennis players
Table tennis players at the 1992 Summer Paralympics
Table tennis players at the 1996 Summer Paralympics
Table tennis players at the 2000 Summer Paralympics
Table tennis players at the 2004 Summer Paralympics
Paralympic table tennis players of Spain
Medalists at the 1992 Summer Paralympics
Medalists at the 2000 Summer Paralympics
Paralympic medalists in table tennis
Paralympic bronze medalists for Spain
Spanish disabled table tennis players
Sportspeople from Granada
Living people